Lucha Britannia is an English lucha libre-style professional wrestling promotion based in Bethnal Green, London since 2006.

History
Lucha Britannia was created by Garry Vanderhorne in 2006 from Rock & Metal Wrestling Action (RAMWA), as an alternative form of physical theatre, music, cabaret, comedy and professional wrestling. In 2007, Lucha Britannia held the first of its six sell-out shows at Bethnal Green Working Men's Club. By November 2007 The promotion had outgrown the Working Men's Club and moved to SeOne, a large nightclub beneath London Bridge station. In December that year they were listed by Time Out in their (London) top five Best alternative nightlife of 2007.

In the summer of 2008 Lucha Britannia featured on the BBC's coverage of the Reading and Leeds festivals and in October that year they co-hosted the inaugural Bizarre Ball in conjunction with Bizarre Magazine. In 2009, Lucha Britannia became the first UK based wrestling promotion to feature on live British television in twenty-five years when they featured in their coverage of the Brit Awards after-party at Earls Court hosted by Rufus Hound. Later that year they returned to co-produce and host the second Bizarre Ball again for Bizarre Magazine.

During 2011, Lucha Britannia put on seventeen events in London and around the UK. In 2016 the promotion increased to hosting semi-monthly shows called Lucha Underground at the Resistance Gallery in Bethnal Green, East London on Friday nights.

Style
Lucha Britannia combines the Lucha Libre style of wrestling that is characterized by the wearing of colourful masks, rapid sequences of holds and maneuvers, tag-teams and "high-flying" with the traditional British technical style, North American and Japanese Puroresu wrestling format.
Aside from wrestling, Lucha Britannia events also include risqué cabaret performances, comedic interludes and side acts.

All the characters and performers in Lucha Britannia loosely fit into a fantastical narrative called the "RetroFutureVerse" wherein a fractious band of outlawed prize-fighters (known as the "United Resistance Movement") battle for justice and dignity against the dastardly representatives of tyrannical rulers (known either as "The State" or "The Yankee Boche") in an ornately cruel, futuristic dystopia.

The promotion runs regular monthly shows called The Lucha Underground from the Resistance Gallery – a venue in Bethnal Green in London's East End. The Resistance Gallery is home to the London School of Lucha Libre, Lucha Britannia's own professional-wrestling training academy, as well as hosting a variety of other events.

Lucha Britannia has also been an attraction on television and at major UK festivals including the Glastonbury Festival, Download Festival, Reading Festival, Leeds Festival and The Brit Awards.

World Championship
As only months are known, each reign is listed as beginning on the first of the month although this may not be true.

See also

Professional wrestling in the United Kingdom
List of professional wrestling promotions in the United Kingdom

References

External links 
 

Wrestling in England
Tourist attractions in the London Borough of Tower Hamlets
Nightclubs in London
British professional wrestling promotions
Lucha libre
2006 establishments in England